The 2007 Balearic Island Council elections were held on Sunday, 27 May 2007, to elect the 8th Island Councils of Mallorca and Menorca and the 1st Island Councils of Formentera and Ibiza. All 72 seats in the four Island Councils were up for election. The elections were held simultaneously with regional elections in thirteen autonomous communities and local elections all throughout Spain.

This was the first time that a separate election was held to elect the members of the Island Councils after the ones held in 1979. From 1983 to 2003, their composition was determined by the Parliament of the Balearic Islands election results in each constituency. In addition, after these elections the Island Council of Ibiza and Formentera was separated into two Island Councils, one per each island, with the City Council of Formentera taking the functions of the Island Council. Therefore, the election results in Ibiza, Mallorca and Menorca are compared to the 2003 Balearic regional election in these constituencies, and the results in Formentera are compared to the 2003 Formentera City Council election.

Opinion polls
The tables below list voting intention estimates in reverse chronological order, showing the most recent first and using the dates when the survey fieldwork was done, as opposed to the date of publication. Where the fieldwork dates are unknown, the date of publication is given instead. The highest percentage figure in each polling survey is displayed with its background shaded in the leading party's colour. If a tie ensues, this is applied to the figures with the highest percentages. The "Lead" column on the right shows the percentage-point difference between the parties with the highest percentages in a given poll. When available, seat projections are also displayed below the voting estimates in a smaller font.

Ibiza polling

Mallorca polling

Menorca polling

Island Council control
The following table lists party control in the Island Councils. Gains for a party are displayed with the cell's background shaded in that party's colour.

Islands

Formentera

Ibiza

Mallorca

Menorca

See also
2007 Balearic regional election
Results breakdown of the 2007 Spanish local elections (Balearic Islands)

Notes

References
Opinion poll sources

Other

Balearic
2007